is a railway station in Minami-ku, Hiroshima, Japan, operated by West Japan Railway Company (JR West). Hiroshima Station is the terminal station for several lines, and all San'yō Shinkansen trains stop here.

Station layout

Hiroshima Station has two main entrances: the north — or Shinkansen — entrance, and the south entrance. Until the 1975 opening of the Shinkansen service, the Shinkansen entrance was called the "north entrance", and many local residents, newspapers, and real estate advertisements continue to refer to it as the "north entrance".

A pedestrian tunnel connects the area in front of the Shinkansen entrance to an underground plaza underneath the south entrance to Hiroshima Station. The tunnel includes many gift shops and restaurants, as well as two exits to Fukuya, one to the Hiroshima Station Tram Stop, one in front of the Hiroshima Higashi Post Office, and one directly in front of the south entrance to Hiroshima Station.

Elevator and escalator access is available for several of the entrances. Events are sometimes held in the large area of the underground plaza in front of the entrance to Fukuya.

Prior to 2017, the south entrance connected the plaza outside directly to the platform for track 1; passengers wishing to access any other track from the south entrance were forced to first enter onto the track 1 platform and then ascend to the concourse above.  Similarly, passengers wishing to exit the south entrance after arriving on any other platform were forced to descend from the concourse level to the track 1 platform to exit.  To eliminate this bottleneck, the concourse level was expanded and a new south entrance was added slightly to the east of the old one. This design, which is standard for major Japanese rail stations, enables direct access to the concourse level from the south entrance.  The new south section of the station was opened on May 28, 2017, and the old south entrance is now under construction. The new south exit and Hiroden platforms will be completely rebuilt. It is planned to reopen in 2025. The south exit is still usable, but often gets rerouted.

Platforms

The Shinkansen station has two island platforms which serve a total of four tracks. The non-Shinkansen lines use three island platforms and one side platform serving eight tracks.

Other tracks:
0: formerly a platform for the Ujina Line
10: formerly a platform for freight services

Hiroden

The  is a terminal station of the Main Line of Hiroshima Electric Railway, located in front of JR Hiroshima Station.

Routes
From Hiroshima Station, there are four of Hiroden Streetcar routes on the Main Line.
 Hiroshima Station - Hiroshima Port Route
 Hiroshima Station - Hiroden-miyajima-guchi Route
 Hiroshima Station - (via Hijiyama-shita) - Hiroshima Port Route
 Hiroshima Station - Eba Route

Connections
█ Main Line
   
Hiroshima Station — Enkobashi-cho

History
Opened as "Honeki-mae" tram stop on November 23, 1912.
Renamed to "Hiroshima-ekimae" on March 30, 1960.
Renamed to "Hiroshima-eki" as the present name "Hiroshima Station", on December 1, 2001.

History

Opened as a station of the Sanyo Railway and started both passenger and freight services between Itozaki Station on June 10, 1894.
Opened the train services between Tokuyama Station on September 25, 1897.
Nationalized as the station of the Japan National Railways on December 1, 1906.
Opened Hiroden "Hon-ekimae", a stop in front of Hiroshima Station on November 23, 1912.
Station building was destroyed in the atomic bombing on August 6, 1945.
The Hiroden stop in front of the Hiroshima Station is renamed "Hiroshima Ekimae" on March 30, 1960.
Completed the current station building and called "Hiroshima Minshu Eki" (Hiroshima the people's Station) in December 1965.
Freight services transferred to "Higashi Hiroshima Station" (now Hiroshima Freight Terminal) on March 1, 1969.
Stopped the passenger train services on Ujina Line on March 31, 1972.
Started the train services on the Sanyō Shinkansen and renamed the north entrance as the "Shinkansen Entrance" on March 10, 1975.
Privatized and started operation as a station of the JR West on April 1, 1987.
Redecorated the south entrance and named the building as "ASSE" in April 1999.
The Hiroden stop in front of Hiroshima Station is renamed "Hiroshima Station Tram Stop" on November 1, 2001.
The Hiroshima Station Shinkansen entrance begins using automated ticket gates on February 27, 2005.
Spring 2007: All station entrances began using automated ticket gates
Summer 2007: The ICOCA card was introduced at Hiroshima Station and all stations within the Hiroshima City Network
May 2017: The old south entrance was closed and the new south entrance was opened.

Connecting bus routes

Chugoku JR Bus
Chugoku JR bus services are operated between Hiroshima Station at the "Shinkansen entrance" (North side) and next stations via Hiroshima Bus Center.
Tokyo Station "Yaesu entrance"
Yokohama Station
Nagoya Station and Sakae Bus Terminal
Kyoto Station "Karasuma entrance"
Osaka Station "Sakurabashi entrance" and USJ
Nanba Station and Tennoji Station
Takamatsu Station
Hiroshima Airport limousine bus

Hiroden Bus
Airport limousine bus service is operated from "Shinkansen entrance" (North side).
Hiroshima Airport limousine bus
Other bus services are operated from "Shinkansen entrance" and "Minami entrance" (South side).

Hiroshima Bus
Airport limousine bus service is operated from "Shinkansen entrance" (North side).
Hiroshima Airport Limousine bus
Other bus services are operated from "Minami entrance" (South side).

Geiyo Bus
Airport limousine bus service is operated from "Shinkansen entrance" (North side).
Hiroshima Airport Limousine bus
Other bus services are operated from "Minami entrance" (South side).
Tadanoumi Station, Onori Station, Takehara Station
Mihara Station
Saijo Station

Hiroshima Kotsu
Airport limousine bus service is operated from "Shinkansen entrance" (North side).
Hiroshima Airport Limousine bus
Other bus services are operated from "Minami entrance" (South side).

Highway access
 Japan National Route 54
 Hiroshima Prefectural Route 37 (Hiroshima-Miyoshi Route)
 Hiroshima Prefectural Route 70 (Hiroshima-Nakashima Route)
 Hiroshima Prefectural Route 84 (Higashi Kaita Hiroshima Route)
 Hiroshima Prefectural Route 164 (Hiroshima-Kaita Route)
 Hiroshima Prefectural Route 264 (Nakayama-Onaga Route)

Surrounding area

South
ASSE - the station building
Yale Yale A-kan - Fukuya Hiroshima Ekimae Store
Hiroshima Higashi Post Office - formerly known as "Hiroshima Chūō Post Office"
Aiyu-ichiba
Futaba Books - Giga Hiroshima Ekimae Store
Hiroshima City Noboricho Junior High School - Sadako Sasaki was enrolled here
Mazda Stadium

North
Hotel Granvia Hiroshima
Hiroshima General Hospital of West Japan Railway
West Japan Railway Hiroshima Office
Hiroshima Higashi Ward Office
Hiroshima City Higashi Ward Library
Onaga Elementary School
Futaba Junior High school
Setouchi High School

See also

Hiroden Streetcar Lines and Routes

External links

 JR West station information 

Railway stations in Hiroshima Prefecture
Geibi Line
Hiroshima City Network
Stations of West Japan Railway Company in Hiroshima city
Kabe Line
Kure Line
Sanyō Main Line
Sanyō Shinkansen
Railway stations in Japan opened in 1894